Kristina Ivanovna Sobol (born 30 November 1991) is a Russian weightlifter, formerly competing in the 53 kg and now competing in the 49 kg category.

In 2021, she competed in the women's 49 kg event at the 2020 Summer Olympics in Tokyo, Japan where she did not rank after failing to register a successful result in the Snatch event.

Major results

References

External links
 

1991 births
Living people
Russian female weightlifters
European Weightlifting Championships medalists
People from Salsk
Weightlifters at the 2020 Summer Olympics
Sportspeople from Rostov Oblast
Olympic weightlifters of Russia
20th-century Russian women
21st-century Russian women